The 1964 BRSCC British Saloon Car Championship, was the seventh season of the championship. It started on 14 March at Snetterton and finished on 19 September at Oulton Park. The title was won by  Formula One champion Jim Clark.

Calendar and results
All races were held in the United Kingdom. Overall winners of multi-class races in bold.

Championship results

References

British Touring Car Championship seasons
Saloon